Lucas Pacheco Affini (born 1 March 1990), commonly known as Lucas Sasha, is a Brazilian professional footballer who plays as a defensive midfielder for Fortaleza.

Club career
Lucas Sasha began his youth career with Corinthians. He was part of the side that won the youth cup – Copa São Paulo de Juniores in 2009. In the same year he moved to Grêmio Barueri.

In 2010, he made his professional debut for Grêmio and played in 16 matches through the season. He competed in only 3 matches for the club during Campeonato Paulista (from January to May). In the second part of the season, he participated in 13 matches in Série A. The team finished 20th in the league and was relegated.

In January 2011, he went on trial to West Ham United. Later he moved to the Italian Catanzaro 1929.

In early 2012 he joined São José and played in Campeonato Paulista Série A2. He played in 10 matches for the club. During the summer of 2012, Sasha passed trial in CSKA Sofia and signed as a free agent with the club. Lucas debuted for CSKA in the second qualifying round of UEFA Europa League, coming on as substitute for Kosta Yanev in a match against Mura 05. He scored his first goal as a CSKA player in A Group against Slavia Sofia. On 31 October he made assist for the equalizing goal and scored the second against Ludogorets Razgrad in a 2–1 win at Ludogorets Arena for the Bulgarian Cup. On 6 April 2013 Sasha netted the winning goal for CSKA against Botev Vratsa as the match finished 4–3 at Hristo Botev Stadium. During the summer of 2013 CSKA experienced a management and financial crisis, causing Lucas to start looking for a new club.

On 4 July 2013 Sasha signed a two-year contract with Hapoel Tel Aviv after a short trial. On 18 July, he marked his debut by scoring a goal and providing an assist in the 4–1 away win over Beroe in the first leg of a UEFA Europa League preliminary round match. He returned to Bulgaria, joining reigning champions Ludogorets Razgrad in the summer of 2015.

On 10 July 2019, he moved to the Greek Superleague, signing a two-year contract with Aris. On 24 August 2019, he scored his first goal for the club, in a 1–1 home draw against OFI. On 10 November 2019, he scored with a beautiful header helping to a 2–1 home win against Asteras Tripolis.

On 4 January 2020, he scored with a perfect shot, after an assist from Giannis Fetfatzidis, to seal a triumphant 4–2 home win against PAOK, at the Derby of Thessaloniki. Ten days later, he helped with a goal to a 2–1 home win against Xanthi, as his team qualified for the quarter finals of the Greek Cup.

In June 2020, Sasha is likely to extend his contract, as everyone in the team has been impressed by his consistency and professionalism.

His first goal for the 2020–21 season came in a 2–2 away draw against Atromitos, on 5 December 2020. In the first game of 2021, Sasha opened the score in a 2–0 home win against Volos.

On 22 March 2021, Sasha signed a new three-year contract, which will keep at the Kleanthis Vikelidis Stadium, until the summer of 2024.

Career statistics

Club

Honours
Corinthians Paulista
 Copa São Paulo de Juniores: 2009

Ludogorets
 Bulgarian First League (4): 2015–16, 2016–17, 2017–18, 2018–19
 Bulgarian Supercup: 2018

References

External links

Lucas Sasha at ogol.com

1990 births
Living people
Brazilian footballers
Grêmio Barueri Futebol players
U.S. Catanzaro 1929 players
São José Esporte Clube players
Fortaleza Esporte Clube players
PFC CSKA Sofia players
Hapoel Tel Aviv F.C. players
PFC Ludogorets Razgrad II players
PFC Ludogorets Razgrad players
Aris Thessaloniki F.C. players
Campeonato Brasileiro Série A players
First Professional Football League (Bulgaria) players
Israeli Premier League players
Super League Greece players
Brazilian expatriate footballers
Expatriate footballers in Italy
Expatriate footballers in Bulgaria
Expatriate footballers in Israel
Expatriate footballers in Greece
Footballers from São Paulo
Association football midfielders